Marilou Dozois-Prévost (born May 11, 1986) is a Canadian weightlifter. Dozois-Prévost won a silver medal in the women's 48 kg division at the 2006 Commonwealth Games in Melbourne, Australia. She finished in 10th place on the 48 kg event at the 2008 Summer Olympics in Beijing. She won the gold medal at the Commonwealth game in New-Delhi in 2010. Prevost was born in Montreal, Quebec.

Notes and references

External links 

 Profile on CBC official site
 Athlete Biography at beijing2008
 Part One of Interview with Marilou Dozois-Prévost at Bleacher Report
 Part Two of Interview with Marilou Dozois-Prévost at Bleacher Report

1986 births
Living people
Canadian female weightlifters
Commonwealth Games gold medallists for Canada
Commonwealth Games medallists in weightlifting
Commonwealth Games silver medallists for Canada
French Quebecers
Olympic weightlifters of Canada
Sportspeople from Montreal
Weightlifters at the 2008 Summer Olympics
Weightlifters at the 2006 Commonwealth Games
Weightlifters at the 2010 Commonwealth Games
21st-century Canadian women
Medallists at the 2006 Commonwealth Games
Medallists at the 2010 Commonwealth Games